Clarence Holmes Lindsay (March 22, 1898 – July 19, 1944), nicknamed "Red", was an American Negro league shortstop in the 1920s.

A native of Columbia, South Carolina, Lindsay attended Johnson C. Smith University. He made his Negro leagues debut in 1920 with the Lincoln Giants. He went on to play for several teams, including the Baltimore Black Sox and Wilmington Potomacs, and finished his career in 1929 with the Bacharach Giants. Lindsay died in New York City, New York in 1944 at age 46.

References

External links
 and Baseball-Reference Black Baseball stats and Seamheads

1898 births
1944 deaths
Bacharach Giants players
Baltimore Black Sox players
Hilldale Club players
Lincoln Giants players
Wilmington Potomacs players
Baseball shortstops
Baseball players from Columbia, South Carolina
20th-century African-American sportspeople
Burials at the Cemetery of the Evergreens